The Real HU is an American college football rivalry game played annually by the Bison of Howard University and the Pirates of Hampton University. The series started in 1908 and is driven by several factors, which include the close proximity of the two Mid-Atlantic schools, the historically high academic standing of both these private institutions as Howard and Hampton are considered Black Ivy League universities and have student-alumni populations from similar backgrounds, and that the two schools have competed in the same athletic conferences for approximately a century.

Previously the two schools competed in the Central Intercollegiate Athletic Association (CIAA) and Mid-Eastern Athletic Conference (MEAC). On November 16, 2017, Hampton announced that they were becoming a member of the Big South Conference in 2018. Due to scheduling reasons, Hampton was to remain in the MEAC for 2018, but the MEAC refused to allow Hampton to play MEAC opponents in 2018, as punishment for leaving the MEAC for the Big South. The rivalry resumed in 2019, with Hampton facing Howard on September 14 in the 22nd Annual Chicago Football Classic at Soldier Field.

The annual football contest has primarily been played at the two respective campus facilities: Armstrong Stadium for Hampton, and Howard's Greene Stadium, although the contest has been played at other locations such as Polo Grounds in New York City, old Giants Stadium in East Rutherford, New Jersey, and at RFK Stadium in Washington, DC.

President Obama's "Real HU" remarks
The rivalry is well-known and has been referenced by President Barack Obama. During his 2010 commencement address at Hampton, President Obama quipped, "Now, before we get started, I just want to say, I’m excited the Battle of the Real H.U. will be taking place in Washington this year. (laughter) You know I am not going to pick sides. (laughter) But my understanding is it's been 13 years since the Pirates lost. (applause) As one Hampton alum on my staff put it, the last time Howard beat Hampton, The Fugees were still together." At the time, Hampton was in the midst of a series long 14-game win streak.

Vice President Kamala Harris
U.S. Vice President Kamala Harris attended the 2021 Football Game between Howard & Hampton.  Vice President Harris is a Howard University Alum, Class of 1986.

Hampton won the game 48–32.

Game results

See also  
 List of NCAA college football rivalry games

References

College football rivalries in the United States
Howard Bison football
Hampton Pirates football
Black college football classics